Belskoye is a rural locality (a selo) in Alataninsky Selsoviet, Sterlitamaksky District, Bashkortostan, Russia. The population was 1,144 as of 2010. There are 9 streets.

Geography 
Belskoye is located 24 km northeast of Sterlitamak (the district's administrative centre) by road. Zabelskoye is the nearest rural locality.

References 

Rural localities in Sterlitamaksky District